Wilbur Bass (born May 31, 1969), better known as Blaq Poet, is an American rapper from Queensbridge, New York City.

Biography
Blaq Poet was first heard on the track "Beat You Down" from the Bridge Wars during 1987, a diss song towards KRS-One and Boogie Down Productions. At that time, Poet was at least 17 years old, as stated in a 2009 radio interview.

During 1991, Poet and DJ Hot Day made a duo called PHD (Poet & Hot Day) and released their debut album, Without Warning, on Tuff City Records. They released after that album several 12-inch singles and an EP until 1996 when they parted ways due to being unable to find another record label. Poet went on to team up with KL, Hostyle and Solo, creating the group Screwball. They released two albums and a compilation together before Poet went solo with the street album Rewind: Deja Screw, released 2006. The album featured production from DJ Premier amongst others.

In 2007, Poet appeared on the track "Victory" on KRS-One and Marley Marl's 2007 album Hip Hop Lives, which was released as proof that the Bridge Wars had ended.

Poet later signed to DJ Premier's label Year Round Records, and he released his second album, Tha Blaqprint, on that label in 2009. The majority of the production was by DJ Premier, and guest appearances were made by the likes of Lil' Fame and Noreaga, as well as Poet’s Year Round labelmates the NYGz and Nick Javas. On the remix version of “Ain't Nuttin' Changed”, a single from Tha Blaqprint, Poet collaborated with West Coast rappers MC Eiht and Young Maylay.

On November 3, 2020, Blaq Poet released an LP with Serious Truth entitled "Cultural Revolution" to critical acclaim. Inspired by current events, the album is also focused on returning hip hop back to its roots and original cultural standards. Cultural Revolution has become a cult classic among hardcore hip hop fans and DJs alike, accumulating 120,000 views, listens & streams across all platforms. Upon the album's release, it frequently found its way onto radio stations in the UK, Germany, Belgium and the USA, as well as DJ Premier's radio show on Sirius XM.

Discography 
1991: Without Warning (collaboration with DJ Hot Day as PHD)
2006: Rewind: Deja Screw
2009: Blaq Out
2009: Tha Blaqprint (produced by DJ Premier)
2011: Blaq Poet Society (produced by Stu Bangas & Vanderslice)
2012: E.B.K. - EveryBody Killa
2013: Blaq Death (produced by Stu Bangas & Vanderslice)
2016: The Most Dangerous
2016: Mad Screws (collaboration with Comet)
2019: EST: Experience, Stories and Truths (EP)
2019: Smoke (EP, with Comet & Astro Vandalist)
2020: Scribes (EP)
2020: Simon Phoenix
2020: Cultural Revolution (collaboration with Serious Truth)

Guest appearances

References 

Living people
Rappers from New York City
African-American male rappers
1969 births
21st-century American rappers
21st-century American male musicians
21st-century African-American musicians
People from Long Island City, Queens
20th-century African-American people